Carex atropicta is a species of sedge native to Chile and Argentina.

References 

atropicta
Flora of Argentina
Flora of Chile